Gunugus or Gunugu was a Berber and Carthaginian town in northwest Africa in antiquity. It passed into Roman control during the Punic Wars and was the site of a colony of veteran soldiers. It survived the Vandals and Byzantines but was destroyed during the Muslim invasion of the area.

Location
Gunugus has been tentativelybut not certainlyidentified with the ruins at Sidi Brahim de Gouraya on the Mediterranean coast near Gouraya, Algeria.

History
Gunugus was a Berber and Carthaginian town from around 550BC. It may have also been the site of a Greek colony at some point

After the Punic Wars, Gunugus was the site of a Roman colony established by Augustus.

It was administered as part of the province of Caesarian Mauretania. The local Berbers made up a large part of the settlement as well.

Gunugus existed through the Vandal Kingdom and the Byzantine reconquest of Africa. It was destroyed around AD640.

Bishopric
The town was also the seat of an ancient Roman Catholic bishopric.  The only known bishop of this diocese is Ausilio, who took part in the synod assembled in Carthage in 484 by the Vandal King Huneric, after which Ausilio was exiled. Today Gunugo Diocese survives as a titular bishopric of the Roman Catholic Church and the current bishop is Sylvester David, of Cape Town.

References

Citations

Bibliography
 . 

Archaeological sites in Algeria
Catholic titular sees in Africa
Roman towns and cities in Mauretania Caesariensis
Ancient Berber cities
Phoenician colonies in Algeria